QW may refer to:

 QWERTY keyboard layout
 IATA code for Qingdao Airlines
 Former IATA code for Blue Wings
 QuakeWorld, a video game
QueerWeek, a newspaper publication
 Enemy Territory: Quake Wars, a video game
 Quantum well, in quantum physics and materials science
 an operator of the Perl programming language
 Quo warranto, a legal term requiring the person to whom it is directed to show what authority they have